Sphingosine kinase 1 is an enzyme that in humans is encoded by the SPHK1 gene.

Sphingosine kinase 1  phosphorylates sphingosine to sphingosine-1-phosphate (S1P) SK1 is normally a cytosolic protein but is recruited to membranes rich in phosphatidate (PA), a product of Phospholipase D (PLD)

Sphingosine-1-phosphate (S1P) is a novel lipid messenger with both intracellular and extracellular functions. Intracellularly, it regulates proliferation and survival, and extracellularly, it is a ligand for EDG1. Various stimuli increase cellular levels of S1P by activation of sphingosine kinase (SPHK), the enzyme that catalyzes the phosphorylation of sphingosine. Competitive inhibitors of SPHK block formation of S1P and selectively inhibit cellular proliferation induced by a variety of factors, including platelet-derived growth factor  and serum.

Interactions 

SPHK1 has been shown to interact with TRAF2.

References

Further reading

External links 
 

EC 2.7.1